A list of notable people affiliated with Oriel College, Oxford University, England, including alumni, academics, provosts and honorary fellows.

Alumni

Academics
Richard Ithamar Aaron – D.Phil student, graduated 1928: Welsh philosopher.
Donald Ferlys Wilson Baden-Powell – Undergraduate 1917: Geologist and palaeolithic archeologist.
Marius Barbeau – Rhodes Scholar 1907–1910: Canadian ethnographer and folklorist.
Geoffrey Barraclough – scholar in History 1926–1929. Chichele Professor of Modern History, University of Oxford, 1970–73.
Harold Idris Bell – Adam de Brome scholar 1897, British papyrologist (specialising in Roman Egypt) and scholar of Welsh literature.
Peter Brunt – Ancient historian.
Anthony Collett – author and writer on natural history.
Richard A. Epstein – American legal scholar
Eric Foner – American historian, Bancroft Prize winner.
Jeff Forshaw – Particle physicist, winner of the Maxwell Medal and Prize.
James Anthony Froude – Undergraduate 1836 to 1840: English historian and Regius Professor of Modern History, 1892 to 1894.
Robert Alfred Cloynes Godwin-Austen – Undergraduate 1826–1830: English geologist, Fellow in 1830.
Sir Francis Knowles, 5th Baronet – Archaeologist
J. L. Mackie – Undergraduate 1938 to 1940: Australian Philosopher.
James Meade – Undergraduate 1926 to 1930: Economist, Nobel Prize award winner.
Edward Thomas Monro – Principal Physician of Bethlem Hospital from 1816.
Henry Monro – President of the Medical Psychological Association in 1864–1865.
Thomas Monro – Principal Physician of Bedlam Hospital from 1816.
Michael Moore – Professor of theoretical physics at the University of Manchester
John Nunn – English chess player and mathematician
Mark Pattison – Undergraduate 1832: English author and rector of Lincoln College, Oxford.
Eduardo Peñalver – American law professor, President-elect of Seattle University, and Dean of Cornell Law School.
Baden Powell – Undergraduate 1814 to 1817: Physicist and theologian, father of Robert Baden-Powell, founder of the Scout Movement.
Paul Preston – Professor in International History at the London School of Economics; historian of modern Spain.
Philip Russell, FRS – Director of the third division of the Max Planck Research Group at the Institute of Optics, Information and Photonics at the University of Erlangen-Nuremberg.
John Martin Robinson – Historian and author.
William David Ross – FBA, philosopher, Aristotelian scholar, Provost of Oriel College, Vice Chancellor of Oxford University.
Rebecca Saxe – Undergraduate 1997–2000, Professor of Brain and Cognitive Sciences, MIT.
Hugh Edwin Strickland – Undergraduate 1829: English geologist, ornithologist and systemist.
Ronald Syme – New Zealand-born historian, was the pre-eminent classicist of the 20th century.
A.J.P. Taylor – Undergraduate 1924 to 1927: Renowned British historian of the 20th century.
Alexander Todd – Undergraduate 1931 to 1934: Chemist, Nobel Prize award winner.
D. E. R. Watt FRSE – Scottish historian and Professor Emeritus at St Andrews University.
Ronald Lampman Watts – Canadian academic and the 15th Principal and Vice-chancellor of Queen's University from 1974 until 1984. 
Miles Weatherall – Physician and research pharmacologist affiliated with London Hospital Medical College and Wellcome Research Laboratories.
Gilbert White – Undergraduate 1739 to 1743, Fellow of the college 1744 to 1793. Pioneering naturalist and ornithologist.

Clergy
William Allen – Undergraduate 1547, Fellow of the college from 1550 to 1561: Principal of St Mary Hall 1556 to 1561, fellow at University of Douai, Cardinal.
Thomas Arundel – Undergraduate 1373: Son of Richard FitzAlan, 10th Earl of Arundel, with whom he erected the first college chapel. Chancellor of England and Archbishop of Canterbury. 
Godwin Birchenough – Dean of Ripon Cathedral.
Lancelot Charles Lee Brenton – Churchman and translator of one of only two English translations of the Septuagint.
Joseph Butler – Undergraduate 1715 to 1718, graduate until 1733: Bishop of Bristol and Dean of St Paul's Cathedral 1740, Bishop of Durham 1750.
David Chillingworth – Bishop of St Andrews, Dunkeld, and Dunblane 2005–
Nigel Cornwall – Bishop of Borneo 1949–1962.
Maxwell Craig – Minister of the Church of Scotland and General Secretary of Action of Churches Together in Scotland 1990–1999.
Harold de Soysa – Bishop of Colombo 1964–1971.
Frank Tracy Griswold – Presiding Bishop and Primate of the Episcopal Church in the United States of America.
Gerald Edgcumbe Hadow – English Christian missionary to East Africa in the mid-twentieth century.
Renn Hampden – Bampton lecturer in 1832, principal of St Mary Hall 1833, Bishop of Hereford 1847.
David Hand – Bishop Coadjutor of New Guinea 1950–1963, Archbishop of Papua New Guinea 1977–1983
James Hannington – Undergraduate 1868 to 1873: Missionary bishop.
George Wyndham Kennion – Anglican bishop of Adelaide and Bath and Wells.
Edward King – Bishop of Lincoln 1885 to 1910.
Thomas Mozley – English clergyman and writer.
Reginald Pecock – Bishop of Chichester
Iain Torrance – President of Princeton Theological Seminary and a former Moderator of the General Assembly of the Church of Scotland.
Vernon White – MLitt in Theology 1980, now principal of STETS and Canon of Winchester
Samuel Wilberforce – Undergraduate 1823 to 1826: Bishop of Oxford and Winchester. Opposed Darwin's theory of evolution in a famous debate with biologist Thomas Huxley.
 Michael Iprgrave – Bishop of Lichfield.

Politicians and civil servants
Alexander Hugh Bruce, 6th Lord Balfour of Burleigh – Scottish politician and statesman, Minister for Scotland 1895 to 1903.
James Brudenell, 5th Earl of Cardigan – Member of Parliament and later peer.
Donald Cameron – Member of the Scottish Parliament since 2016.
Baron Clements – Irish nobleman and politician.
George Coldstream – Permanent Secretary to the Lord Chancellor's Office
José Agustín de Lecubarri – Spanish diplomat and peer
Peter Emery – Member of Parliament from 1959 to 2001, appointed Privy Counsellor in 1993.
William Grant – Scottish MP (1955 to 1962) and judge. Lord Justice Clerk 1962 to 1972.
George Wellesley Hamilton – Ontario political figure, Canadian Conservative MP from 1871 to 1874.
William Gerard Hamilton – English Statesman, Chief Secretary for Ireland 1761 to 1764.
Daniel Hannan – British politician and Conservative MEP (1999 to 2020).
James Howard Harris, 3rd Earl of Malmesbury – Foreign Secretary 1852 and 1858 to 1859, Lord Privy Seal 1866 to 1868 and 1874 to 1876.
Alan Haselhurst – British politician – Deputy Speaker of the House of Commons 1997 to 2010, later a life peer.
Sidney Herbert, 1st Baron Herbert of Lea – English statesman.
Baron Maude of Stratford-upon-Avon – Conservative party MP from 1963 to 1983, Paymaster General from 1979 until 1981.
David Menhennet CB (1928–2016), 10th Librarian of the House of Commons Library
Paul Murphy – Secretary of State for Northern Ireland (2002 to 2005) and for Wales (2008 to 2009), later a life peer.
Wilfrid Normand, Baron Normand – Scottish politician and judge.
Phillip Oppenheim – MP from 1983 to 1997, businessman, credited for introducing Mojitos to the UK.
Robert Pierrepont, 1st Earl of Kingston-upon-Hull – Member of parliament (1601) and hereditary peer.

Cecil Rhodes – Undergraduate 1873, 1876 to 1878, 1881: Politician, businessman and the effective founder of the state of Rhodesia.
Andrew Robathan – British Conservative politician, and Member of Parliament for Blaby.
Thomas Sotheron-Estcourt – British politician, Home Secretary 1859.
John Spencer-Churchill, 7th Duke of Marlborough – Undergraduate 1840: Lord President of the Council 1867; grandfather of Sir Winston Churchill.
Charles Talbot, 1st Baron Talbot of Hensol – Lord Chancellor 1733 to 1737.
Christopher Rice Mansel Talbot – Industrialist, Liberal Member of Parliament for Glamorgan for sixty years.
William Vesey-FitzGerald – British politician, Governor of Bombay 1867 to 1872 and Member of Parliament for Horsham.
Lutz Graf Schwerin von Krosigk – Reich Minister of Finance 1932 to 1945, Leading Minister and de facto Chancellor of Germany 1945.

Civil servants
Henry Unton – English diplomat, ambassador to Henry IV of France.
Frederic Rogers, 1st Baron Blachford – British civil servant.
Oswald Rayner – British intelligence officer
Cranley Onslow – MI6 field agent and privy counsellor.
Peter Neyroud – chief executive officer (Designate) for the National Policing Improvement Agency (NPIA), and former Chief Constable of Thames Valley Police.
David Manning – British Ambassador to the United States, Hon. Fellow.
Stewart Crawford – diplomat
Robert Chalmers, 1st Baron Chalmers – BA 1881. Governor of Ceylon 1913–1915
Fabian Picardo – Chief Minister of Gibraltar
Herman Merivale – English civil servant and author.
Lebrecht Wilhelm Fifi Hesse – First Black African Rhodes Scholar, former Director General of the Ghana Broadcasting Corporation
Hugh Trevor Lambrick – archaeologist, historian and administrator

Literary and performing artists
Jon Bentley – British journalist and television presenter.
Norman Cameron – poet.
Rosaline Elbay – actor and writer.
Edmund Fellowes – Undergraduate 1889 to 1892: Music editor and author on 16th and 17th century English music.
David Giles – British television director.
Os Guinness – Writer and social critic living in McLean, Virginia.
Peter Harness – British dramatist and screenwriter.
Christopher Hibbert – English writer and popular historian and biographer.
Michael Hoffman – Undergraduate 1979: Film director
Thomas Hughes – Undergraduate 1841 to 1845: Author of Tom Brown's Schooldays, founder member of the Christian Socialists.
Richard Hughes – British writer of poems, short stories, novels and plays.
Francis Kynaston – Undergraduate 1601: English courtier and poet.
Matt Lacey – actor and comedian.
James Leasor – Undergraduate 1946 to 1948: English writer and popular historian.
Eugene Lee-Hamilton – Late-Victorian English poet.
Philip Napier Miles – 1865–1935 – composer and philanthropist.
Martin Mills – British Music Industry Executive.
Nick Newman – cartoonist and scriptwriter
Adam Raphael – journalist.
Rachel Riley – television presenter.
Eric Schlosser – American journalist and author.
W. C. Sellar & R. J. Yeatman – Undergraduates 1919 to 1922: Humorists, authors of 1066 and All That.
William Seward, matriculated 1764, anecdotist and conversationalist
Richard Simpson – British Roman Catholic writer and literary scholar.
J. I. M. Stewart – Scottish author whose pen name was Michael Innes.
Joseph Warton – English academic and literary critic.
Nigel Williams – novelist, playwright and screenwriter.
Sandy Wilson – British lyricist and composer of The Boy Friend (1954).
Michael Wood – Popular British historian, broadcaster and television presenter.
Camilla Wright – Editor of Popbitch
David Wright – Author and poet.
 Jonathan Charles – former BBC Broadcaster

Lawyers, judges and statesmen
 Kwamena Bentsi-Enchill – judge and academic; justice of the Supreme Court of Ghana (1971–1972)
Geoffrey Bindman – human rights lawyer.
Alexander Croke – British judge, colonial administrator and author influential in Nova Scotia of the early 19th century.
Thomas Fairfax, 6th Lord Fairfax of Cameron – Undergraduate 1710 to July 1713: friend and patron of George Washington.
 Sir Francis Ferris QC (1932–2018) – High Court Judge (Chancery Division).
George Joachim Goschen, 1st Viscount Goschen – British statesman and businessman.
John Holt – Lord Chief Justice of England and Wales from 1689 to 1710.
William Prynne – Graduated BA 1621; lawyer, author, polemicist.
Walter Raleigh – Undergraduate 1572 to 1574: Courtier, statesman, scientist, writer, poet, spy, and explorer.
A. N. Ray – Chief Justice of India (1973–77). Studied modern history.
William Scroggs – Undergraduate 1639 to c.1640: Lord Chief Justice over the Popish Plot.

Sports people
Bernard Bosanquet – Undergraduate 1896 to 1899: Triple Blues, English test cricketer, inventor of the googly.
George Bridgewater – New Zealand rower, Bronze medallist in the pair at the 2008 Summer Olympics
Charles Wreford-Brown – Captained the England national football team several times between 1894 and 1895, credited with inventing the word soccer.
Peter Hackworth – British coxswain, cox of the 2002 Blue Boat
Sjoerd Hamburger – Dutch rower, competed in the 2009 and 2010 Boat Races
Malcolm Howard – Canadian rower, Olympic Gold medalist and 2014 OUBC President
Chris Mahoney – British rower, Olympic Silver medalist in 1980
Lucas McGee – American rower, USRowing Men's National Team coach
Pete Reed – British rower, Olympic champion 2008, and world champion 2005/6.
Plum Warner – Played first-class cricket for Oxford University, Middlesex and England.

Other people
David Arculus – English businessman.
Raj Bahra – Philosophy, Politics and Economics undergraduate and contestant on Channel 4's The Taste.
Beau Brummell – Undergraduate 1794: Dandy and arbiter of fashion.
Clive Cheesman – Undergraduate: Richmond Herald 2010–current.
Graham Chipchase – CEO of Rexam plc.
Geoffrey Sandford Cox – former editor and chief executive of ITN and a founder of News at Ten.
James Ralph Darling – Headmaster of Geelong Grammar School, and Chairman of the Australian Broadcasting Commission.
Michael Edwards – academic, writer and activist.
Chris Green – British railway manager.
Charles Handy – Management educator. Honorary Fellow.
Edward Leigh, 5th Baron Leigh – Undergraduate 1761 to 1764: High Steward of Oxford University and benefactor.
Jim Mellon – British businessman. Honorary Fellow.

Provosts

Fellows and lecturers 

Matthew Arnold – Elected 28 March 1845, perpetual Fellow 17 April 1846, vacated (due to marriage) 6 April 1852: Poet and critic, Oxford Professor of Poetry from 1857 to 1867
Thomas Arnold – Elected 31 March 1815, perpetual Fellow 20 July 1816, year of grace (due to marriage) 12 August 1820: Headmaster of Rugby School 1828 to 1841 and Regius Professor of Modern History from 1841 to 1842.
John Ashwardby – follower of John Wycliffe, Vice-Chancellor of the University of Oxford (1391–1394)
Robert Beddard – Fellow to 2006: British historian.
Henry Bishop – member of the Royal Commission into the Operation of the Poor Laws 1832
Derek Blake – Wellcome Trust Senior Fellow in Basic Biomedical Science at Oriel until 2007.
Joseph Bowles – Bodley's Librarian, Fellow from 1719
Henry Brooke – schoolmaster and divine
Thomas Edward Brown – Elected 21 April 1854, perpetual Fellow 13 April 1855, year of grace (due to marriage) 24 June 1857: Poet.

James Bryce, 1st Viscount Bryce – Elected 25 April 1862, perpetual Fellow 6 April 1863, resigned June 1893, honorary fellow 12 October 1894: British jurist, historian and politician.
John Burgon – Elected 17 April 1846, perpetual Fellow 5 April 1847: Dean of Chichester Cathedral.
The Rev. Charles Fox Burney – Oriel Professor of the Interpretation of Holy Scripture from 1914, elected Fellow in 1919
Jeremy Catto – Fellow to 2006: British historian.
Thomas Kelly Cheyne – Fellow 1885 to 1905: English Biblical critic.
Richard William Church – Fellow 1838, Dean of St Paul's 1871–1890.
Arthur Hugh Clough – Elected 1 April 1842, perpetual Fellow 21 April 1843: English poet.
Thomas Cogan – physician, fellow in 1563, resigned his fellowship 1574
John Cook Wilson – Fellow in 1874, Wykeham Professor of Logic from 1889
Richard Alan Cross – Fellow, Professor of Medieval Theology and Tutor in Theology.
Henry William Carless Davis – Fellow 1925 to 1928: British historian, editor of the Dictionary of National Biography and Regius Professor of Modern History.
John Davison – clergyman and theological writer, Fellow 1800, and tutor at Oriel
George Anthony Denison – Elected 11 April 1828, perpetual Fellow 24 April 1829: English churchman, curate of Cuddesdon.
Frederick Dillistone – Dean of Liverpool (1956–1963), Fellow and Chaplain of Oriel (1964–70)
John Flemming – economist and Warden of Wadham College, Oxford, Lecturer and Fellow (1963–65)
James Fraser – Elected 24 April 1840, perpetual Fellow 1841, vacated fellowship 20 December 1861: Anglican Bishop of Manchester 1870 to 1885.
Hurrell Froude – Early leader of the Oxford Movement, Fellow in 1826.
Robert Fysher – Bodley's Librarian, Fellow in 1726
Vivian Hunter Galbraith – Fellow of the British Academy and Oxford Regius Professor of Modern History.
Eric Graham – priest, Fellow and Dean of Oriel
Alexander Grant, 10th Baronet – Elected 13 April 1849, perpetual Fellow 1 April 1850, vacated (married) 2 June 1860: British educationalist and Principal of the University of Edinburgh
Charles Edward Grey – Member of Parliament for Tynemouth and North Shields (1838–1841), elected in 1808
Dalziel Hammick – Chemist, Fellow (1920–1966)
John Harris – Bishop of Llandaff (1728–1738), Fellow in 1728
William Holt – Jesuit, elected on 29 February 1568
Simon Hornblower – Fellow until 1997, since when Professor of Classics and Grote Professor of Ancient History University College London
Robert Ingham – barrister and politician, Fellow from 1816 until 1826.
Richard William Jelf – Principal of King's College London, elected as Fellow in 1820.
John Keble – Fellow 1811 to 1835: One of the leaders of the Oxford Movement, Oxford Professor of Poetry from 1831 to 1841, gave his name to Keble College in 1870.
Richard Kilvington – philosopher. 
Raymond Klibansky – Honorary Fellow, Canadian Philosopher.
William Lewis – mineralogist, elected 1871
Humphrey Lloyd – Bishop of Bangor from 1674 until 1689, Fellow in 1630.
Richard Mant – Fellow 1798: English churchman and writer.
Charles Marriott – priest and a member of the Oxford Movement, Fellow 1833
Basil Mitchell – British philosopher and Nolloth Professor of the Philosophy of the Christian Religion, Fellow 1968.
John Henry Newman – Major figure in the Oxford Movement.
Thomas Nowell – clergyman, historian, fellow in 1753 and Dean 1758–1760 and in 1763.
Cadwallader Owen – Welsh clergyman, Fellow from 1585 to no later than 1606
Frederick York Powell – Fellow and Regius Professor of Modern History, 1894 to 1904
Edward Bouverie Pusey – One of the leaders of the Oxford Movement.
George Richards – priest, poet, Fellow 1790–1796
Samuel Rickards – priest, opponent of the Oxford Movement, Fellow from 16 April 1819 to 6 October 1822
Howard Robinson – philosopher, Fellow and lecturer in philosophy (1970–1974), Provost (Pro-Rector) of the Central European University.
John Robinson – Fellow, English diplomat, Bishop of Bristol and London.
Richard Robinson – Fellow and Tutor in Philosophy 1946–69, Author of An Atheists Values
John Rouse – second Bodley's Librarian, friend of John Milton, Fellow 1600.

William Young Sellar – Fellow, Scottish classical scholar.
William Henry Stowe – scholar and journalist, Fellow March 1852
John Van Seters – Visiting Research Fellow (1985–86)
Thomas Vesey, 1st Baronet – Irish clergyman, Bishop of Ossory from 1714 to 1730
William Wand – Fellow and Dean from 1925: English born Anglican Archbishop of Brisbane, Australia.
Richard Whately – Undergraduate, Fellow 1811: English logician, economist and theological writer, Archbishop of Dublin
Robert Wilberforce – clergyman, writer, second son of William Wilberforce, Fellow 1826–1831.
John Wordsworth – Oriel Professor of the Interpretation of Holy Scripture, Bishop of Salisbury.

Current fellows
Ordered by seniority of fellowship, oldest first;
Gordon MacPherson – (Reader in Experimental Pathology, Turnbull Fellow and Tutor in Medicine), Former Senior Tutor. Emeritus.
Glenn Black – Emeritus Fellow.
David Charles – Colin Prestige Fellow and Tutor in Philosophy
John Barton – Oriel Professor of the Interpretation of Holy Scripture
Michael Spivey – Misys and Andersen Fellow, Tutor in Computer Science, and Dean of Degrees
David Hodgson – Todd Fellow and Tutor in Chemistry
Teresa Morgan – William and Nancy Bissell Turpin Fellow and Tutor in Ancient History, Senior Dean
Brian Leftow – Nolloth Professor of the Philosophy of the Christian Religion
Ian Horrocks – Professor of Computer Science

Honorary Fellows 

The following is a list of former and current Honorary Fellows who have not been included elsewhere in this article.

 Sir Al Ainsley-Green, Children's Commissioner for England (2005–2009) 
  Anthony Barber, Baron Barber of Wentbridge, British Conservative politician, Chancellor of the Exchequer and member of the House of Lords.
 Jonathan Barnes – scholar of ancient philosophy, Fellow (1968–78), elected a Fellow of the British Academy in 1987.
 James Barr – British Old Testament scholar.
 Anthony Collett – author and writer on natural history.
 Francesco Cossiga – Italian politician and former President of Italy, professor of law at University of Sassari.
 Sir Zelman Cowen – Fellow 1947 to 1950, 19th Governor-General of Australia.
 Sir Crispin Davis – businessman, former chief executive of Reed Elsevier.
 Sir John Elliott – Eminent English historian and former Regius Professor of Modern History.
 Robert John Weston Evans – Regius Professor of Modern History
 Sir Ewen Fergusson – British diplomat, former ambassador to France.
 Eric Foner – American historian, Bancroft Prize winner.
 Robert Fox, British historian of science.
 Charles Handy – Management educator, author and philosopher. 
 Philip Harris, Baron Harris of Peckham – Conservative peer and businessman
 John Hegarty – Irish physicist, Provost of Trinity College, Dublin (2001–2011)
 Sir Michael Howard – military historian, formerly Chichele Professor of the History of War, Hon. Fellow and Regius Professor of Modern History, 1980 to 1989
 Isobel, Lady Laing – wife of Kirby Laing, of the civil engineering company
 Lee Seng Tee – Singaporean businessman and philanthropist.
 David Manning – British Ambassador to the United States.
 Colin Mayer – Peter Moores Professor of Management Studies at the Saïd Business School 
 Kenneth O. Morgan – Welsh historian and author
 Paul Murphy – Secretary of State for Wales and former Secretary of State for Northern Ireland.
 Keith Murray, Baron Murray of Newhaven – Graduate of Oriel, Agricultural academic, Rector of Lincoln College, Chancellor of Southampton University (1964–74)
 William Abel Pantin – historian, Fellow and Lecturer in History, Keeper of the Archives for the university, Hon. Fellow 1971.
 Patrick Prendergast – Provost of Trinity College, Dublin
 Thomas Symons – founding President of Trent University, Canada
 John Vickers – economist and Warden of All Souls College, Oxford.
 Norman Willis – Former General Secretary of the TUC and President of the European Trade Union Confederation.

Former Visiting Fellow:
 Antonia Logue – novelist and Visiting Fellow:

References 

Rannie, David, Oriel College (1900) — published by F. E. Robinson & Co. London (part of the University of Oxford College Histories series).
Salter H. E. and Lobel, Mary D. (editors), The Victoria History of the County of Oxford, Volume III: The University of Oxford — Oxford University Press VCH series, (1954), pp. 119–129 .

Oriel College
People associated with Oriel College, Oxford